Isolepis habra is a species of flowering plant in the sedge family. A small, tufted perennial plant growing to 30 cm tall, seen in south eastern Australia and New Zealand.

References

habra
Flora of New South Wales
Flora of New Zealand
Flora of Victoria (Australia)
Flora of South Australia
Flora of Queensland
Flora of Tasmania
Plants described in 1966